Cyperus diurensis is a species of sedge that is endemic to central and eastern Africa.

The species was first formally described by the botanist Johann Otto Boeckeler in 1879.

See also 
 List of Cyperus species

References 

diurensis
Taxa named by Johann Otto Boeckeler
Plants described in 1879
Flora of Ethiopia
Flora of Kenya
Flora of Zambia
Flora of Zimbabwe